Iota Delphini (ι Del, ι Delphini) is a star in the constellation Delphinus. It has an apparent magnitude of about 5.4, meaning that it is just barely visible to the naked eye. Based upon parallax measurements made by the Gaia spacecraft, this star is located at a distance of 196 light years.

Iota Delphini's spectral type is A1IV, meaning it is an A-type subgiant. Observations of the star's spectrum reveal a periodic Doppler shift. This means that Iota Delphini is a spectroscopic binary with a period of 11 days and an eccentricity of 0.23. However, almost no information is known about the companion star.

Iota Delphini appears to be an Am star, also known as a metallic-line star. These types of stars have spectra indicating varying amounts of metals, like iron. Observations of Iota Delphini's spectrum have showed lower amounts of calcium and higher amounts of iron than usual.

References

Delphini, Iota
Delphinus (constellation)
101800
196544
7883
BD+10 4339
A-type subgiants
Delphini, 05
Am stars